Following is a list of results from the 2006 Acura Classic singles tennis competition.  The 2006 Acura Classic was a tennis tournament played on outdoor hard courts in San Diego in the United States. It was part of Tier I of the 2006 WTA Tour. The tournament was held from July 29 through August 6, 2006.

Mary Pierce was the defending champion, but lost in the quarterfinals to Maria Sharapova.

Sharapova reached the final where she defeated Kim Clijsters 7–5, 7–5 to win her title.

Seeds
The top eight seeds received a bye into the second round.

Draw

Finals

Top half

Section 1

Section 2

Bottom half

Section 3

Section 4

External links
 ITF tournament details

Southern California Open
Acura Classic - Singles